Xiphiola is a genus of short-horned grasshoppers in the family Acrididae. There are at least two described species in Xiphiola, found in South America.

Species
These two species belong to the genus Xiphiola:
 Xiphiola borellii Giglio-Tos, 1900
 Xiphiola cyanoptera (Gerstaecker, 1889)

References

External links

 

Acrididae